Natalie Tran (born 24 July 1986), known online as communitychannel, is an Australian YouTuber, actress, and comedian. She is best known for her comedy videos in which she discusses everyday issues.

She began posting on YouTube in 2006 while attending University of New South Wales. From 2006 to 2016, her channel consisted primarily of observational comedy videos with monologues. Tran was the most subscribed-to YouTuber in Australia and one of the highest-earning YouTubers globally in the late 2000s and early 2010s. She ceased uploading routinely to YouTube in late 2016 due to anxiety.

Outside of YouTube, Tran's acting career has consisted of a supporting role in the romantic comedy film Goddess (2013), as well as recurring roles on the Foxtel sketch comedy show The Slot (2017–2018), the FX/Foxtel comedy-crime drama series Mr Inbetween (2018–2021) as Jacinta, and the Network 10 sketch comedy show Kinne Tonight (2018–2020). She is scheduled to host The Great Australian Bake Off starting in 2023.

Early life and education
Natalie Tran was born on 24 July 1986 in the suburb of Auburn in Sydney, New South Wales, Australia, to refugee parents who travelled to Australia from Vietnam in 1981. Her mother previously practiced law, while her father practiced literary lecturing. Her sister, Isabel, travelled with Tran's parents from Vietnam. After the family resettled in Sydney, Tran's mother found employment in the postal service, while her father became a public school teacher. Tran credits her parents for making her success possible, expressing that they "endured so much to give my sister and I great lives."

Tran was raised in Auburn, and attended primary school in Lidcombe. After graduating, she attended Rosebank College in Five Dock, before transferring to Meriden School, an Anglican all-girls school in Strathfield, in year nine, where she graduated in 2004. Speaking about her secondary school experience, she shared that she "wasn't really a fan", sharing, "I'm not a very ambitious or very applied student." After high school, she attended the University of New South Wales, where she originally majored in education after being inspired by her father, but, following the success of her YouTube channel, began studying and later completing a degree in Digital Media. While attending the University of New South Wales, she worked in retail.

Career

YouTube
Tran began posting to her YouTube channel in 2006, initially posting responses to other videos she had seen on the site. Her content then consisted of observational comedy skits and vlogs, which lampooned everyday situations, in which she played all of the characters and gave monologues throughout.

In 2007, Tran was invited to participate in the launch of YouTube Australia. A video of her defending Vegemite was featured on the Australian television programme A Current Affair in February 2007. Tran was nominated for two awards for Best YouTube Channel or Personality and for Funniest YouTube Channel at Mashable's 2009 Open Web Awards. Tran partnered with Lonely Planet in 2010 to make a series of travel videos, chronicling her journey around the world to places such as Paris, New York City, Los Angeles and Buenos Aires.

By 2009, Tran was the most subscribed-to YouTuber in Australia and the 37th most subscribed-to globally. In 2010, she became the 18th most subscribed-to YouTuber globally. Also in 2010, Tran was the 10th highest-earning YouTuber on the platform, having made over $101,000 in advertising revenue between July 2009 to July 2010, according to TubeMogul. By 2011, she had earned over one million subscribers. In 2013, she started a relationship advice series called Love Conundrums on her YouTube channel, which she later discontinued. She was included in the lineup at YouTube FanFest Australia 2015. In an April 2015 presentation at Brown University posted to her YouTube channel, she talked about Asian representation and stereotypes in the media. In December 2015, she appeared in Lilly Singh's promotional video for her #GirlLove campaign, which aimed to end socialised competition among women, alongside Shay Mitchell, Hannah Hart, and others.

Her April 2016 parody of Johnny Depp and Amber Heard's video apology for breaking Australian biosecurity laws, in which she depicts them as being held at gunpoint while filming the video, received praise from critics. In February 2017, her Valentine's Day video, in which she serenaded her partner while he played video games using a virtual reality headset, also gained traction online. She became an ambassador for YouTube's Creators for Change initiative in September 2016. In December 2017, as part of the program, she released White Male Asian Female, a 40-minute documentary about negative perceptions of relationships between Asian women and Caucasian men such as her own, on her YouTube channel. She hosted a video guide segment for the 2019 Sydney Film Festival called the Launch Show, released in May 2019.

Television and film

From 2010 to 2011, Tran worked as a Sydney correspondent for The Projects The Whip segment. She made her debut film appearance in the 2013 romantic comedy film Goddess as Helen. From 2017 to 2018, she appeared as a series regular on the sketch comedy show The Slot. She appeared in all three seasons of the FX series Mr Inbetween in the recurring role of Jacinta, the ex-wife of the protagonist, Ray, played by series creator Scott Ryan. She appeared as a guest in the pilot episode of the sketch comedy series Kinne Tonight in August 2018. In 2020, she returned to the show during its second season as a recurring guest.

Other endeavors
Six months after returning home from her Lonely Planet trip in 2011, Tran co-launched a travel app for the Australian Department of Foreign Affairs and Trade with the country's former Foreign Minister Kevin Rudd.

Public image

Tran has frequently been referred to in the media as the "Australian Queen of YouTube". She has appeared on multiple lists of the best Australian YouTubers. The Daily Telegraph called her "one of Australia’s original success stories on YouTube". Wired placed Tran on their list of "The Top 10 Geeks from Downunder". In 2011, Tran was included in The Sydney Morning Heralds annual list of Sydney's 100 most influential people. In 2014, Tran was listed on NewMediaRockstarss list of their top 100 YouTube channels. Digital Trends named her video "Indoor Plant Serial Killer" as one of the funniest YouTube videos of all time in 2020.

Personal life
Tran became vegetarian in 2015, and later became vegan. In 2011, she began dating Rowan Jones, a producer who she met during her time on The Project. , the two work together as freelance videographers.  She is an atheist.

After not having posted any videos since December 2016, Tran stated in 2019 that she isolated herself and stopped posting YouTube videos due to anxiety from her obsessive–compulsive disorder.

Filmography

References

External links

 
 Second channel on YouTube
 
 
 

1986 births
Living people
Australian atheists
Australian people of Vietnamese descent
Actresses from Sydney
Video bloggers
Australian video bloggers
Women video bloggers
Australian YouTubers
Australian film actresses
University of New South Wales alumni
Australian women bloggers
People with obsessive–compulsive disorder
Comedy YouTubers